Ramalina menziesii, the lace lichen or fishnet, is a pale yellowish-green to grayish-green foliose lichen. It grows up to a meter long, hanging from bark and twigs in a distinctive net-like or lace-like pattern that is unlike any other lichen in North America. It becomes a deeper green when wet. Apothecia are lecanorine. it is an important food source for deer in the Coast Range of California, and a source of nest material for birds. It is highly variable in its growth form, with branches sometimes so slender as to appear like strands, sometimes tiny, and sometimes large with broadly flattened branches.
 
After years of effort, the California Lichen Society was able to convince the state legislature to recognize the lichen as the state lichen of California, the first lichen so honored.

Taxonomy
In 1775, the species was given its first Linnean binomial name of Lichen retiformis by Archibald Menzies. It was also referred to as Lichen reticulatis by Nohden in 1801. Thomas Taylor then incorporated the taxon into the genus Ramalina and described it in the London Journal of Botany in 1847 as Ramalina menziesii. Vernacular names used for the species include "lace lichen" and "fishnet".

Description
Ramalina menziesii is a fruticose epiphytic lichen found on coastal regions of North America that produce a large and conspicuous thallus. Expansion of its perforated tissue from the thallus apex produces its net-like morphology. This morphology ranges from thick nets in sunny regions to thin filaments in foggy regions. Studies have suggested that this morphological variation is a result of both genetic differences between populations, as well as phenotypic plasticity within the species.

Lichen spot tests on the cortex are K−, C−, P− and KC+ (dark yellow).

Distribution and habitat
Ramalina menziesii is found from the Baja California of Mexico to the temperate rainforests of Alaska, with six distinct ecoregions. Throughout their distribution, the occupied habitat differs in relation to the distance from the coast. In Baja California, lace lichen is most common on shrubs in the coastal fog deserts and on cacti, shrubs and trees in the inland chaparral habitats. In coastal California, lace lichen is found in habitats dominated by coastal live oak, tan oak, California laurel, red alder, and willow. In the Californian inland, the habitats are dominated by oak savannas of valley oak, blue oak, and coastal live oak. The northern and southern Californian habitats are geographically separated from the coastal range. As you move towards the Pacific Northwest, lace lichen is found in temperate mixed coniferous forests of Sitka spruce, western hemlock, and some broad-leafed species. As you move inland in their northern distribution, lace lichen quickly disappear. The range of the lichen continues north along the Pacific Coast of British Columbia, extending to Alaska.

In the deciduous blue oak (Quercus douglasii) woodlands of central coastal California, Ramalina menziesii has an important role in the annual turnover of biomass. The standing biomass of this and other epiphytic lichens was determined to be 515 grams per tree, equivalent to 706 kilograms per hectare; of this, 94% is R. menziesii. Despite this area being much drier than those in other similar studies, R. menziesii was shown to contribute as much to biomass and nutrient turnover as other epiphytic lichens from wetter locales.

Photobiont
Lichen are a great example of a symbiotic interaction between a fungal body and an algal photobiont. The photobiont provides energy to the organism via photosynthesis, while the fungal body provides a habitat. 94% of the photobiont lineages of Ramalina menziesii are associated with Trebouxia decolorans, while the remainder are Trebouxia jamesii. While Ramalina menziesii only associates with one algal species, it has been found in association with six other fungal species.

Trebouxia decolorans shows significant genetic structure depending on the ecoregion, phorophyte species, and climate. This structure was likely shaped by geographic barriers or differences in climate and habitat. Within each ecoregion, specialization of T. decolorans to its specific phorophyte species was found. This allows for local adaptation and has an impact on the genetic structure of the population.

Bioindicators
Lichen have long been used as bioindicators for atmospheric pollution because they derive much of their resources from the air. Many species are also sensitive to environmental change, making them accurate warning signs for pollution. A study of archived Ramalina menziesii specimens showed a history of lead contamination in California. Lead concentrations in lace lichen peaked in 1976 at 880 μg/g due to leaded gasoline emissions and have since decreased to 0.2–4.7 μg/g.

In recent years, Ramalina menziesii has bioaccumulated of monomethylmercury (MMHg) from coastal marine atmospheric fog. High concentrations found in lace lichen are transmitted to the deer that consume them, and later to the apex predators that consume the deer—a process called biomagnification. Although fog-borne MMHg only accounts for a small percentage of atmospheric deposition, it may have a disproportionate impact leading to toxicological effects on Puma concolor in coastal California.

Historical uses
Ramalina menziesii was first documented for its use by indigenous tribes of California. The Kawaiisu people reportedly used it for its magical properties. It would be placed in water to bring rain or placed in fire to repel thunder or lightning. The Kashaya Pomo people in Northern California used it as a sanitary material.

References

See also
Spanish moss, a plant of similar appearance and habit

menziesii
Lichen species
Lichens described in 1847
Lichens of Western Canada
Lichens of the United States
Lichens of Subarctic America
Symbols of California
Taxa named by Thomas Taylor (botanist)